The Nokia 5230 (also known as the Nokia 5230 Nuron) is a smartphone manufactured by Nokia, running Symbian OS v9.4, S60 5th Edition. It was released in November 2009 after being announced in August of the same year.

It features a 3.2-inch resistive touchscreen, 3G internet support and support for microSD memory cards.  It also supports A-GPS, Bluetooth, FM radio and full HTML internet browsing.  However, it lacks support for Wi-Fi due to its status as an entry-level smartphone.  It was released after with the Nokia 5530 and Nokia 5800 XpressMusic, which featured Wi-Fi support (but not 3G) and both 3G and Wi-Fi, respectively.

During its lifespan, the 5230 sold around 150 million units, making it one of the best selling phones to date. It has had particular success in developing countries.

51.0.002 is the latest firmware version available.

Variants

5233/5228
A cost-reduced variant called the 5233 (5228 in some markets) was released in 2010. It also shares the same form factor as the base 5800 and 5230, but is further cut down as it lacks support for 3G networks.

5230 Nuron
The Nuron version, released only in North America, which has WCDMA Band IV (AWS) enabled, comes preloaded with maps of the United States, Canada and Mexico. In January 2010, Nokia announced that Ovi Maps will be available for free for certain smartphones which includes the Nokia 5230, thus enabling free offline voice guided navigation for more than 180 countries.

Issues
An incident involving a used Nokia 5233 occurred in 2018, eight years after the phone was released, when a teenage girl in India died as a result of injuries stemming from her 5233 as its battery exploded whilst in the middle of a conversation with a relative.

References

External links 
 Nokia 5230 Complete Device Specifications

Nokia smartphones
Symbian devices
Portable media players
Handwriting recognition
S60 (software platform)
Digital audio players
Personal digital assistants
Devices capable of speech recognition
Mobile phones introduced in 2009